Ye Qing (born 13 November 1988) is a Chinese actress. She rose to fame after portraying Yu Tan in the television series historical television series Scarlet Heart (2011), which enjoyed the highest ratings in mainland China. Her film breakthrough came in 2014 with her performance as Zhang Yan in the wuxia film Brotherhood of Blades, for which she won the Best Newcomer at the Chinese Australia International Film Festival and was nominated for the Best Newcomer at the 22nd Beijing College Student Film Festival.

Early life and education
Ye was born on November 13, 1988 in Yakeshi, Inner Mongolia, China. She graduated from Beijing Film Academy.

Acting career
Ye Qing's first film role was an undergraduate of Jiangsu University in the biographical film Love Angel (2009). Following this, she appeared in numerous roles in other films, including One Wrong Step (2011), Love on that Day (2011), and My Family (2013).

She gained fame for her supporting role as Yu Tan in the historical television series Scarlet Heart (2011), adapted from Tong Hua's novel of the same title.

In 2012, she had a key supporting role in Xuan-Yuan Sword: Scar of Sky, a fantasy wuxia drama. That same year, she also appeared in other television series, including anthology romance drama Refresh 3+7 and romance series Conspiracy of Love.

Ye was cast as the female lead in the wuxia film Man of Tai Chi (2013), She then co-starred in the action film Urban Games.

In 2014, she played a supporting role in Scarlet Heart 2, the modern sequel to Scarlet Heart. She also starred in the wuxia film Brotherhood of Blades. She was nominated for the Best Newcomer at the 22nd Beijing College Student Film Festival and won the Best Newcomer at the China Australia International Film Festival.

Ye had a supporting role in romance drama Woman on the Breadfruit Tree (2015).

In 2016, Ye co-starred in fantasy wuxia drama Chinese Paladin 5. She then appeared in historical seriesPrincess Jieyou as Feng Liao, a politician and diplomat in the Western Han dynasty. That same year, she featured in romance comedy film My Best Friend's Wedding,  and Oxide Pang's war film My War.

Ye appeared in the romantic television series Love & Life & Lie (2017). She made a guest appearance on Midnight Diner.  Ye joined the main cast of The Starry Night, the Starry Sea II as Ming Zhu, a blind girl of the owner of the teahouse. She then featured in romance drama Across the Ocean to See You.

In 2018, Ye starred in the suspense web drama Romantic Detective.

In 2019, Ye starred in the crime drama  Your Secret, and historical mystery drama Under The Power.

Filmography

Film

Television series

Awards

References

External links
 
 
 Ye Qing on Chinesemov

1988 births
Beijing Film Academy alumni
Living people
21st-century Chinese actresses
Chinese film actresses
Chinese television actresses
Actresses from Inner Mongolia
People from Hulunbuir
Manchu actresses